Chamberlain may refer to:

Profession
Chamberlain (office), the officer in charge of managing the household of a sovereign or other noble figure

People 
Chamberlain (surname)
Houston Stewart Chamberlain (1855–1927), German-British philosopher and racialist writer
Joshua Chamberlain (1828–1914), Brigadier General of American Civil War and Governor of Maine
Neville Chamberlain (1869–1940), British Prime Minister at the outbreak of World War II
Wilt Chamberlain (1936–1999), American basketball player

Places 
Chamberlains, Newfoundland and Labrador, Canada
Chamberlain, Ontario, Canada
Chamberlain, Saskatchewan, Canada
Chamberlain Township, Brule County, South Dakota, a township
Chamberlain, South Dakota, United States, a city
Chamberlain, Uruguay
Chamberlain Basin, Custer County, Idaho
Chamberlain Square in Birmingham, England
D.S. Chamberlain Building, listed on the National Register of Historic Places in Polk County, Iowa

Arts, entertainment, and media
Chamberlain (band), an American indie rock band from Indiana, active since 1996
Lord Chamberlain's Men, William Shakespeare's playing company

Law 
Chamberlain v. Skylink
Chamberlain v. Surrey School District No. 36
Chamberlain v. The Queen (No.2), see: Death of Azaria Chamberlain
Chamberlain Hrdlicka, law firm

Other uses 
Chamberlain Engineering, a former auto racing team
Chamberlain Group, a manufacturer of garage door openers
Chamberlain Tractor, or Chamberlain John Deere, a brand of Agricultural Tractor and the company that made them
Operation Chamberlain, an American military operation during the 2003 Invasion of Iraq

See also 
Chamberlayne (disambiguation)
Chamberlin (disambiguation)